The ice hockey team rosters at the 1998 Winter Olympics for the men's tournament consisted of the following players:

Austria
Head coach:  Ron Kennedy

Belarus
Head coach: Anatoli Varivonchik

Assistant coach: Mikhail Zakharov

Canada
Head coach: Marc Crawford

Assistant coaches: Wayne Cashman, Mike Johnston, Andy Murray

Czech Republic
Head coach: Ivan Hlinka

Assistant coaches: Slavomir Lener, Vladimir Martinec

Finland
Head coach: Hannu Aravirta

Assistant coach: Esko Nokelainen

France
Head coach:  Herb Brooks

Assistant coach:  James Tibbetts

Germany
Head coach:  George Kingston

Italy
Head coach: Adolf Insam

Japan
Head coach:  Björn Kinding

Assistant coach: Toru Itabashi

Kazakhstan
Head coach: Boris Alexandrov

Russia
Head coach: Vladimir Yurzinov

Assistant coaches: Zinetula Bilyaletdinov, Pyotr Vorobyov

Slovakia
Head coach: Jan Sterbak

Sweden
Head coach: Kent Forsberg

Assistant coach:  Barry Smith

United States
Head coach: Ron Wilson

References

Sources

Hockey Hall Of Fame page on the 1998 Olympics

rosters
1998